Cush Jumbo  (born 23 September 1985) is a British actress and writer. She is best known for her leading role as attorney Lucca Quinn in the CBS drama series The Good Wife (2015–16) and the CBS All Access spin-off series The Good Fight (2017–21).

Jumbo starred as DC Bethany Whelan in the ITV crime drama series Vera (2012, 2015–16) and as Lois Habiba in the third series of Doctor Who spin-off Torchwood in 2009.

She has received acclaim for her work in theatre. Jumbo received a Laurence Olivier Award nomination for playing Mark Antony in Julius Caesar in 2013, and also wrote and performed in the play Josephine and I. She was awarded an Evening Standard Theatre Award for her one-woman show, and reprised her performance Off-Broadway in 2015. Jumbo made her Broadway debut in Jez Butterworth's The River in 2014, and received her second Olivier nomination upon her 2021 return to the London stage as Hamlet.

Early life
Jumbo was born in King's College Hospital in the Denmark Hill section of London to parents Angela (née Hall) and Marx Jumbo. Her mother is British and her father is Nigerian. The second of six children, she grew up in Lewisham and Southwark. She began dance classes at the age of 3, learning tap, ballet and modern, and went on to learn street dance, contemporary, ballroom, and Latin in later years. As a child, she attended Adamsrill Primary School in Sydenham. From the age of 11 to 15, she trained at the Francis Cooper School of Dance whilst attending Cator Park School for Girls, but at 14 she left Cator Park to pursue acting more seriously at the BRIT School in Croydon. She graduated with a first from the BA (Hons) Acting course at Central School of Speech and Drama before starting her career. She considered undertaking teacher training in London before finally settling on a career as an actress.

Career
Jumbo's theatre credits include Brixton Stories at the Lyric Theatre, Hammersmith, Liquid Gold at the Almeida and Love's Labour's Lost at Shakespeare's Globe. She has also appeared in productions of The Cherry Orchard, The Crucible, The Caucasian Chalk Circle, Richard III and Pygmalion at the Royal Exchange Theatre in Manchester for which she received MEN and Ian Charleson Award nominations. In 2012 she won the Ian Charleson Award for her performance as Rosalind in William Shakespeare's As You Like It at the Royal Exchange Theatre, Manchester. Clare Brennan of The Guardian spoke of Jumbo's performance in As You Like It saying "If these performances truly reflect her talent, Jumbo looks set to become one of the best actresses of her generation". Jumbo played Constance Neville in She Stoops to Conquer at the National Theatre in 2012 and Mark Antony in an all female production of Julius Caesar at the Donmar Warehouse for which she received a nomination for an Olivier Award. She took part again in the production when it was revived in New York in October 2013. In May 2013, she played the role of Nora in A Doll's House at the Royal Exchange Theatre. In October 2013 she won a UK Theatre Award for this performance.

In July and August 2013, Jumbo performed in her own debut play Josephine and I, a one-woman play about jazz singer Josephine Baker, which premiered at the Bush Theatre, London. She won an Emerging Talent Award at the London Evening Standard Theatre Awards in November 2013 for this performance. The show was developed for transfer and began previews on 27 February 2015 at The Public Theater in New York.

She made her Broadway debut in the autumn of 2014 when she appeared in the transfer of the Royal Court Theatre production of The River by Jez Butterworth, alongside Laura Donnelly and Hugh Jackman.

Jumbo also co-wrote the musical Rebels and Retail, a shortlisted entrant in the Perfect Pitch West End Showcase 2008.

Jumbo is the co-author of 101 Dance Ideas for 5–11 yr Olds which is published by A & C Black.

On television, Jumbo has appeared in My Family, Harley Street, as receptionist Hannah Fellows, as Lois Habiba in all five episodes of Torchwood: Children of Earth, as Becky on BBC Three's drama series Lip Service, Casualty and as Nurse Damaris in Getting On Series 2 and 3, written by Jo Brand, Jo Scanlon and Vicki Pepperdine in which she was directed by fellow Torchwood actor Peter Capaldi. She appeared as DC Bethany Whelan in series 2 of ITV's Vera starring Brenda Blethyn and returned to the show for series 5, broadcast in 2015, and for episode 1 of series 6 in 2016. She has also appeared several times on BBC Radio 4 in dramas and as a guest on the panel show Dilemma. She became a regular cast member in the 2015–2016 season of the CBS series The Good Wife until the series ended in 2016. She reprised her role in the series' spin-off The Good Fight. On 29 May 2020 Jumbo announced that she is departing the series after four seasons.

In October 2021, Jumbo played the title role in a production of Hamlet at the Young Vic Theatre in London, directed by Greg Hersof. The Guardian's Arifa Akbar praised her interpretation of the character as a "clear-eyed son" in a performance of "shining clarity". In 2022, she received an Olivier Award nomination for Best Actress and Critics' Circle Theatre Award for Best Shakespearean Performance.

Personal life
Jumbo married Sean Griffin in 2014 and they have a son, born in 2018.

Filmography

Film

Television

Honours 
Jumbo was appointed Officer of the Order of the British Empire (OBE) in the 2019 Birthday Honours for services to drama.

Awards and nominations

References

External links
 

Living people
1985 births
21st-century English actresses
Actresses from London
Alumni of the Royal Central School of Speech and Drama
Black British actresses
English people of Nigerian descent
English Shakespearean actresses
English stage actresses
English television actresses
Ian Charleson Award winners
Officers of the Order of the British Empire
People educated at the BRIT School
People from Denmark Hill